Mt. Lebanon High School is a four-year, comprehensive high school located in Mt. Lebanon, Pennsylvania, with an enrollment of 1,801 students in grades 9–12 for the 2020–2021 school year. Its mascot is the Blue Devil.

History 

The school was originally built in 1927, and was described after being built as one of the most advanced schools in the state. The school had two additions added in 1956 and 1957. Ground was broken in 1970 for an addition, which was completed in 1972. This addition added another six story building connected to the original building, an arts wing connected to the auditorium, and a new gymnasium. Ninth grade students were added to the school due to overcrowding at the junior high schools. 

In 2012, construction started for the Science Wing and a new Athletic Building that includes a new pool, a main gym, two smaller gyms, and an exercise center. Remaining portions of the school that were renovated include the 1930 wing on Cochran Road, the Auditorium, and Fine Arts Wing. These were completed in 2017. 

The old South Gym was renovated into the Center Court, which functions as the cafeteria, and is located to be accessible from all main courses.

Athletics
The sports teams compete in the Western Pennsylvania Interscholastic Athletic League - District 7 of the PIAA. The teams go by the name "Blue Devils" and the school mascot is the Blue Devil. The student section is known as the Devil's Den. The high school has a sports rivalry with Upper St. Clair High School.

Football
 1 PIAA state championship (2021)
Baseball (Boys)
 1 PIAA state championship (1998)
Basketball
Boys: 1 PIAA state championship (1940)
Girls: 3 PIAA state championships (2009, 2010, and 2011)
Cross Country
Boys: 12 PIAA state titles (1941, 1943, 1944, 1945, 1950, 1952, 1953, 1956, 1957, 1958, 1959, 1998) 
Football
1 PIAA state championship (2021)
Hockey
Boys' Ice: 2 PIHL state championships (1976 and 2006).
Soccer
Boys: 1 PIAA state championship (1981)
Girls: 1 PIAA state championship (1992)
Swimming
Girls: 1 PIAA state championship (2002)
Volleyball 
Girls: 2 PIAA state titles (1997 and 2000)

Extracurricular activities
In the 2002–03 school year, the high school received one of six Outstanding School Awards from the Educational Theatre Association.  The school's theater program began in 1930 and has produced a number of notable actors.

In 2006, the fine arts department was rated one of eight finest nationwide by the U.S. Department of Education.

In 2007, the American Music Conference listed Mt. Lebanon High school as one of the "Best 100 Communities for Music Education". Mount Lebanon Percussion ensemble were invited by the NHL to perform at the 2011 NHL Winter Classic on live TV for the country.
The Mt. Lebanon Forensic Team won the Western Pennsylvania District Forensic Championship four years in a row, beginning in 2001. In 2004, the team won the state championship in dramatic interpretation and extemporaneous speaking and then earned a second-place title in extemporaneous speaking at the national competition in Salt Lake City.  In 2006, the team captured the Pennsylvania High School Speech League championship,

The Devil's Advocate is Mt. Lebanon High School's monthly student newspaper.

Notable alumni

Kurt Angle (born 1968) - professional wrestler
Troy Apke (born 1995) - NFL cornerback and special teamer
Matt Bartkowski (born 1988) - ice hockey defenseman
Richard Baumhammers (born 1965) - spree killer and former immigration lawyer
Patti Burns (1952-2001) - journalist and TV news anchor
Susan J. Crawford (born 1947) - lawyer
Gwyn Cready (born 1962) - author
Brian Cuban (born 1961) - attorney and author
Mark Cuban (born 1958) - billionaire entrepreneur 
Ave Daniell (1914-1999) - football tackle
Todd DePastino - author and history professor
Q. Todd Dickinson (1952-2020) - USC(IP) and USPTO director
Scott Ferrall (born 1965) - radio personality
Dave Filoni (born 1974) - director
John E. Frank (born 1962) - surgeon and former footballer
Ian Happ (born 1994) - MLB player
Terry Hart (born 1946) - former NASA astronaut and engineer 
Gillian Jacobs (born 1982) - actress
Don T. Kelly (born 1980) - MLB player and coach
Dan Klein (born c.1976) - computer science professor
Rich Lackner (born 1956) - football coach
Vince Lascheid (1923-2009) - Pittsburgh Pirates and Penguins organist
Daniel London (born 1973) - actor
Joe Manganiello (born 1976) - actor
Andrew Mason (born 1981) - businessman and entrepreneur 
Matt McConnell (Born 1963) - Television Broadcaster, Arizona Coyotes, NHL
Rick Peterson (born 1954) - baseball coach and former pitcher
Rich Skrenta (born 1967) - computer programmer
Grace Martine Tandon (born 1998) - singer
Ming-Na Wen (born 1963) - actress
Brian S. Williams (born 1966) - NBA football center
Josh Wilson (born 1981) - MLB player
Matt Kennedy Gould, American former television personality and basketball coach

Notable staff
Orlando Antigua (born 1973) - basketballer; was assistant basketball coach
Armen Gilliam (1964-2011) - basketballer; was a volunteer assistant coach
George Savarese (born 1965) - radio personality and educator

References

External links 

Schools in Allegheny County, Pennsylvania
Mt. Lebanon, Pennsylvania